Christopher Lyle Cooper (born December 27, 1977) is a former American football defensive lineman in the National Football League for the Oakland Raiders, Dallas Cowboys, San Francisco 49ers, Seattle Seahawks and Arizona Cardinals. He also was a member of the California Redwoods in the United Football League. He played college football at Nebraska-Omaha.

Early years
Cooper attended Lincoln Southeast High School. He received All-state honors at defensive tackle and offensive tackle as a senior. He also practiced basketball, playing at forward and center.

College career
He accepted a football scholarship from Division II University of Nebraska-Omaha, where he became a four-year starter at defensive tackle.

As a redshirt freshman, he registered 21 tackles, 6 tackles for loss and 4 sacks. As a sophomore, he tallied 29 tackles, 10 tackles for loss (second on the team) and 7 sacks (led the team). As a junior, he had 45 tackles and 9 sacks (led the team).

As a senior, he posted 44 tackles (fourth on the team), 20 tackles for loss (led the team), 11 sacks (led the team), 5 passes defensed, 2 forced fumbles and 4 fumble recoveries. He set school records for career sacks (31) and tackles for loss (53).

Pre-draft

Professional career
Cooper was selected by the Oakland Raiders in the sixth round (184th overall) of the 2001 NFL Draft. He appeared in 11 games with one start, while posting 22 tackles, 2 sacks and one interception. He had 6 tackles and one sack against the Kansas City Chiefs. He had 5 tackles and one sack against the Tennessee Titans.

In 2002, he appeared in 16 games with one start, while collecting 19 tackles one sack, one pass defensed and one forced fumble. He had 3 tackles, one sack and one forced fumble against the New England Patriots. He made 3 defensive tackles and also played on special teams in the AFC Divisional playoff game against the New York Jets. He had 3 defensive tackles in the AFC Championship game against the Tennessee Titans. He had 3 defensive tackles in Super Bowl XXXVII against the Tampa Bay Buccaneers.

In 2003, he appeared in 16 games with 9 starts, while recording 49 tackles, 2.5 sacks, 3 passes defensed, one forced fumble and 3 fumble recoveries. He had 4 tackles against the Detroit Lions. He made 4 tackles against the New York Jets. He had 5 tackles, one sack, one forced fumble and one fumble recovery against the Minnesota Vikings. He made 3 tackles, one sack and one pass defensed against the Kansas City Chiefs. He had 7 tackles against the Denver Broncos. He made 6 tackles and a half-sack against the San Diego Chargers. In November, he was one of four Raider players (Bill Romanowski, Barret Robbins and Dana Stubblefield) implicated in the BALCO scandal. All four were notified by the NFL after testing positive for the designer steroid tetrahydrogestrinone (THG), but he was not suspended, because the league was unaware of the steroid at the time of the original tests.

On September 11, 2004, he was traded to the Dallas Cowboys in exchange for a conditional draft choice (not exercised). He appeared in 2 games as a backup and was declared inactive in 5 contests. He was waived on November 3.

On November 10, 2004, he was signed by the San Francisco 49ers. He appeared in 8 games with 2 starts. He made 3 tackles and one sack against the Tampa Bay Buccaneers. He had 7 tackles against the Buffalo Bills. He finished the season with 16 tackles and one sack. On August 23, 2005, he was placed on the injured reserve list with a shoulder injury. He was released on February 23.

On May 8, 2006, he was signed by the Seattle Seahawks. He was declared inactive in the first 2 games. On September 22, 2006, he was released to make room for the acquired wide receiver Deion Branch. On September 26, 2006, he was signed by the Arizona Cardinals. He had 23 tackles, 2 sacks, 3 passes defensed and one fumble recovery as a backup. In 2007, he appeared in 12 games (declared inactive 4 contests) as a backup defensive end in the team's 3-4 defense, tallying 6 tackles. He was released on February 21, 2008. 

On March 25, 2008, he signed with the Seattle Seahawks. He was lost for the season and placed on the injured reserve list on August 30.

In 2009, he signed with the California Redwoods in the United Football League. On April 6, 2010, he was signed as a free agent by the Oakland Raiders. He was released on September 4. He finished his career with 134 tackles, 8.5 sacks, one interception, 8 passes defensed and 4 forced fumbles.

References

External links
Professional Stats
California Redwoods bio

1977 births
Living people
Sportspeople from Lincoln, Nebraska
Players of American football from Nebraska
American football defensive ends
American football defensive tackles
Nebraska–Omaha Mavericks football players
Oakland Raiders players
Dallas Cowboys players
San Francisco 49ers players
Seattle Seahawks players
Arizona Cardinals players
Sacramento Mountain Lions players
Doping cases in American football